Martsel Koen (born 5 July 1933) is a Bulgarian former sports shooter. He competed at the 1960, 1964 and the 1968 Summer Olympics.

References

1933 births
Living people
Bulgarian male sport shooters
Olympic shooters of Bulgaria
Shooters at the 1960 Summer Olympics
Shooters at the 1964 Summer Olympics
Shooters at the 1968 Summer Olympics
Sportspeople from Plovdiv
20th-century Bulgarian people